

This is a list of the National Register of Historic Places listings in St. Louis County, Missouri.

This is intended to be a complete list of the properties and districts on the National Register of Historic Places in St. Louis County, Missouri, United States. Latitude and longitude coordinates are provided for many National Register properties and districts; these locations may be seen together in a map.

There are 187 properties and districts listed on the National Register in the county.  Another 3 properties were once listed but have been removed.  Because the city of St. Louis is separate from St. Louis County, properties and districts in the city are listed elsewhere.

Current listings

|}

Former listings

|}

See also
 List of National Historic Landmarks in Missouri
 National Register of Historic Places listings in Missouri

References

 
St. Louis